Aaron Burbridge (born December 23, 1993) is a former American football wide receiver. He played college football at Michigan State, and was drafted in the sixth round of the 2016 NFL Draft by the San Francisco 49ers.

Early years
Burbridge attended Harrison High School in Farmington Hills, Michigan. He was rated by Rivals.com as a four-star recruit and committed to Michigan State University to play college football.

College career
As a true freshman at Michigan State in 2012, Burbridge played in 11 games with seven starts and recorded 29 receptions for 364 yards and two touchdowns. He had 22 receptions for 194 yards as a sophomore in 2013 and 29 receptions for 358 yards and one touchdown as a junior in 2014. Burbridge became Michigan State's number one receiver in 2015. He was named the Big Ten wide receiver of the year in 2015.

College statistics

Professional career

San Francisco 49ers
Burbridge was drafted by the San Francisco 49ers in the sixth round, 213th overall, in the 2016 NFL Draft.

On September 2, 2017, Burbridge was placed on injured reserve.

On September 1, 2018, Burbridge was waived/injured by the 49ers and was placed on injured reserve. He was released on September 12, 2018. He was re-signed to the practice squad on October 23, 2018. He was released on November 1, 2018.

Denver Broncos
On January 24, 2019, Burbridge signed a reserve/future contract with the Denver Broncos. He announced his retirement from the NFL on July 17, 2019.

References

External links
Michigan State Spartans bio

1993 births
Living people
People from Farmington Hills, Michigan
Players of American football from Michigan
American football wide receivers
Michigan State Spartans football players
San Francisco 49ers players
Denver Broncos players